Alfredo Magalhães Silva Rodrigues (born 18 December 1961 in Azurém, Guimarães), known as Laureta, is a Portuguese retired footballer who played as a left back.

External links

1961 births
Living people
Portuguese footballers
Association football defenders
Primeira Liga players
Liga Portugal 2 players
Vitória S.C. players
FC Porto players
S.C. Braga players
Gil Vicente F.C. players
Associação Académica de Coimbra – O.A.F. players
Portugal under-21 international footballers
Portugal international footballers
Sportspeople from Guimarães